Chaitanyapur is a village and a gram panchayat, in Sutahata CD block in Haldia subdivision of Purba Medinipur district in the state of West Bengal, India.

Geography

Location

Urbanisation
79.19% of the population of Haldia subdivision live in the rural areas. Only 20.81% of the population live in the urban areas, and that is the highest proportion of urban population amongst the four subdivisions in Purba Medinipur district.

Note: The map alongside presents some of the notable locations in the subdivision. All places marked in the map are linked in the larger full screen map.

Demographics
As per 2011 Census of India Chaitanyapur had a total population of 3,169 of which 1,660 (52%) were males and 1,509 (48%) were females. Population below 6 years was 286. The total number of literates in Chaitanyapur was 2,692 (93.38% of the population over 6 years).

Transport
Chaitanyapur is located at the crossing of Kukrahati-Haldia Road and Haldia-Tamluk-Mecheda Road.

Barda railway station nearby is a station on the Panskura-Haldia line. The line was constructed in 1968 and was electrified in 1974-76.

Education
Vivekananda Mission Mahavidyalaya at PO Chaitanyapur was established in 1968. It offers courses in arts, science and commerce. Vivekananda Mission Asram Sikshayatan and Saradamoni Vidyalaya are also notable school in chaitanyapur.

References

Villages in Purba Medinipur district